Kickin' and Screamin' is the fourth studio album by American rapper Krizz Kaliko, released on May 15, 2012. It debuted at #43 on the Billboard 200, making it his most successful album.

Background 
Krizz Kaliko first announced the title of his album in early 2011. After the release of Tech N9ne's EP Klusterfuk, Strange Music began to reveal information on the upcoming album by Krizz Kaliko. On March 15, 2012, Krizz Kaliko contacted rapper Hopsin through Twitter for a collaboration for the album. Several days later, Hopsin responded and agreed to collaborate for the album.

On April 3, 2012, a pre-order for the album was released. The pre-order includes the free download of the album's bonus track, "Bad Man" featuring Oobergeek. Revealed features for the album include Tech N9ne, Wrekonize and Bernz of ¡Mayday!, Twiztid, Chamillionaire, Twista, T-Pain and Rittz. It had been revealed through Twitter that Hopsin was intended to be on the album, however the track was not completed in time to make the album.

Track listing

References

2012 albums
Krizz Kaliko albums
Albums produced by Seven (record producer)
Strange Music albums